Saboria is a suco in Aileu subdistrict, Aileu District, East Timor. The administrative area covers an area of 22.14 square kilometres and at the time of the 2010 census it had a population of 713 people.

References

Populated places in Aileu District
Sucos of East Timor